The Vivo V3 and V3 Max are Android-based smartphones manufactured by Vivo Communication Technology Co. The phones were released in April 2016.

References 

Vivo smartphones
Mobile phones introduced in 2016
Discontinued smartphones